Aarhus Methodist Church, also known as Betlehemskirken, is a church in Aarhus, Denmark. The church is situated in Øgadekvarteret in the Vesterbro neighbourhood on the corner of Thunøgade and Hjarnøgade. Aarhus Methodist Church is a part of the United Methodist Church in Denmark and has served the Methodist congregation in Aarhus since its construction in 1912. Before the church was built, the congregation used a smaller church situated in an apartment in the alley of Posthussmøgen.

See also
 List of churches in Aarhus

References

External links
 
 

Churches in Aarhus
Churches in the Central Denmark Region
Churches completed in 1912